History of the Jin dynasty may refer to:

History of the Jin dynasty (266–420)
Book of Jin, an official historical text covering the Jin dynasty (266–420)
History of the Jin dynasty (1115–1234)
History of Jin, an official historical text covering the Jin dynasty

See also
Jin dynasty (disambiguation)